London Counties was a representative cricket side that was formed during the Second World War by Charles Jones.

Upon the outbreak of the Second World War, the government issued an order "closing all places of entertainment and outdoor sports meetings".  However, this was soon rescinded and there was instead an emphasis placed on "business as usual" through the war.  Sports began to resume once more with a limited schedule.  The County Championship was cancelled, but county sides put out teams to play against each other and against representative sides.  Charles Jones formed London Counties, a side that played their games at Lord's Cricket Ground, and other locations around London.  London Counties played its first recorded game, a two-day match against Northamptonshire XI on 18 May 1940, winning by 128 runs.  They relied primarily on established southern professionals, and gained a reputation for being a team of "hitters and known fast scorers".

During the war years, London Counties formed a friendly rivalry with a British Empire XI, a similarly set up representative side.  Both of these sides did a lot of work for war charities.

See also
 1940 to 1944 English cricket seasons

References

Bibliography
 Nick Hayes and Jeff Hill, Millions Like Us – British Culture in the Second World War, Liverpool University Press, 1999

External links
 Wisden Archive
 Matches played by London Counties at CricketArchive 

Cultural history of World War II
English cricket in the 20th century
Cricket teams in London
Former senior cricket clubs